The Constantinople massacre of 1821 was orchestrated by the authorities of the Ottoman Empire against the Greek community of Constantinople in retaliation for the outbreak of the Greek War of Independence (1821–1830). As soon as the first news of the Greek uprising reached the Ottoman capital, there occurred mass executions, pogrom-type attacks, destruction of churches, and looting of the properties of the city's Greek population. The events culminated with the hanging of the Ecumenical Patriarch, Gregory V and the beheading of the Grand Dragoman, Konstantinos Mourouzis.

Background

In early March 1821, Alexandros Ypsilantis crossed the Prut river and marched into Moldavia, an event that marked the beginning of the Greek War of Independence. Immediately in response of rumors that Turks had been massacred by Greeks in the Danubian Principalities, particularly in Iași and Galați, the Grand Vizier ordered the arrest of seven Greek bishops in Constantinople. In addition, on the evening of April 2, the first news of the Greek Revolt in southern Greece reached Constantinople.

Leading personalities of the Greek community, in particular the Ecumenical Patriarch, Gregory V, and the Grand Dragoman, Konstantinos Mourouzis, were accused of having knowledge of the revolt by the Sultan, Mahmud II, but both pleaded innocence.

The Ecumenical Patriarch was forced by the Ottoman authorities to excommunicate the revolutionaries, which he did on Palm Sunday, . Although he was unrelated to the insurgents, the Ottoman authorities still considered him guilty of treason because he was unable, as representative of the Orthodox population of the Ottoman Empire, to prevent the uprising.

Executions of the Patriarch and the Grand Dragoman

Although the Patriarch found himself forced to excommunicate the revolutionaries, he still failed to appease the Ottoman rulers. Later, on the same day as the excommunication, the Sultan ordered the execution of the Grand Dragoman, Konstantinos Mourouzis. He was arrested at the house of the Reis Effendi and beheaded, while his body was displayed in public. Moreover, his brother and various other leading members of the Phanariote families were also executed, although in fact only a few Phanariotes were connected with the revolutionaries.

Despite the efforts of the Orthodox Patriarch to profess his loyalty to the Sultan, the latter remained unconvinced. One week after the excommunication, on Easter Sunday, he was grabbed by Ottoman soldiers during the liturgy and hanged at the central gate of the Patriarchate. Thus, although he was completely uninvolved with the Revolution, his death was ordered as an act of revenge. His body remained suspended at the gate for three days, and was then handed to a Jewish mob (there had been animosity between the Greek and Jewish communities of Constantinople at the time), dragged through the streets before being thrown into the Golden Horn. The body was eventually picked up by the Greek crew of a Russian ship, brought to Odessa, and fifty years later was brought to Greece, where, on the one hundredth anniversary of his death, Gregory V was formally proclaimed a saint by the Greek Orthodox Church. Gregory's execution caused outrage throughout Greece and the rest of Europe, and resulted in an upsurge of sympathy and support for the rebels in Europe. The gate from which he was hanged remains closed to this day.

Spread of the massacres (April–July 1821)

On the day of the hanging of Gregory V, three bishops and dozens of other Greeks, high officials in the Ottoman administration, were quickly executed in various parts of the Ottoman capital. Among them were the metropolitan bishops, Dionysios of Ephesus, Athanasios of Nicomedia, Gregory of Derkoi, and Eugenios of Anchialos.

Moreover, the execution of the Patriarch signaled a reign of terror against the Greeks living in Constantinople in the following weeks, while fanatical Muslims were encouraged to attack Greek communities throughout the Ottoman Empire. Thus, groups of fanatical Turks, including janissaries, roamed the streets of the city, as well as the nearby villages. They looted Greek churches and property, initiating a large-scale pogrom. Around 14 Christian churches suffered heavy damage, while some of them were completely destroyed. The Patriarchal complex also became one of the targets. Eugenius II, the newly elected Patriarch, saved himself at the last moment, by escaping to the roof. During this period, the Ottoman authorities sought prominent Greeks from all over Constantinople: in government service, in the Orthodox Church, or members of prominent families and put them to death by hanging or beheading. In addition, several hundred Greek merchants in the city were also massacred.

By May 1821, restrictions on the local Greeks increased, while churches continued to be assaulted. On May 24, Patriarch Eugenius presented a memorandum to the Ottoman authorities, begging them to be merciful towards the Greek people and church, claiming that only a few Greeks revolted and not the entire nation. Eugenius also repeated the excommunication of Gregory toward the revolutionaries. Nevertheless, public executions of Greeks were still a daily occurrence in Constantinople. On June 15, five archbishops and three bishops were executed. Additionally, in early July, seventy shared the same fate. Additionally, 450 shopkeepers and traders were rounded up and sent to work in mines.

Anti-Greek massacres in other parts of the Ottoman Empire (May–July 1821)
The same state of affairs also spread to other major cities of the Ottoman Empire with significant Greek populations. In Adrianople, on May 3, the former Patriarch, Cyril VI, nine priests and twenty merchants were hanged in front of the local Cathedral. Other Greeks of lower social status were executed, sent to exile or imprisoned.

In Smyrna, numerous Ottoman troops were staged, waiting orders to march against the rebels in Greece. They entered the city and together with local Turks embarked on a general massacre against the Christian population of the city which amounted to hundreds of deaths. During another massacre in the predominantly Greek town of Ayvalik, the town was burned to the ground, for fear that the inhabitants might rebel and join the revolution in Greece. As a result of the Ayvalik massacres, hundreds of Greeks were killed and many of the survivors were sold as slaves.

Similar massacres against the Greek population during these months occurred also in the Aegean islands of Kos and Rhodes. Part of the Greek population in Cyprus was also massacred. Among the victims was the archbishop Kyprianos, as well as five other local bishops.

Aftermath
The British and Russian ambassadors made strong protests to the Ottoman Empire as reaction of the execution of the Patriarch. The Russian ambassador in particular, Baron Stroganov protested against this kind of treatment towards the Orthodox Christians, while his protest climaxed after the death of the Patriarch. In July 1821, Stroganov proclaimed that if the massacres against the Greeks continued, this would be an act of war by the Porte to all Christian states. The public opinion in the European countries was also affected, especially in Russia.

Legacy
The events in Constantinople were one of the reasons that triggered massacres against Turkish communities in regions where the uprising was in full swing. On the other hand, part of the jurisdiction of the Ecumenical Patriarch, secured in 1453, was revoked. The Patriarchate had until then been vested by the Ottoman Empire as the sole representative of the Orthodox communities of the Empire. Apart from leader of the Greek Orthodox millet, the Orthodox Patriarch was also responsible for legal, administrative, and educational rights of his flock. The Patriarchate never recovered from the atrocities that occurred in the city in 1821.

Motivation
The massacres were undertaken by the Ottoman authorities, as a reaction to the outbreak of the Greek Revolution, centered in southern Greece. The victims of these actions were hardly related to the revolution, while no serious investigations were conducted by the Ottoman side in order to prove that there was any kind of involvement by the people put to death.

References

Sources

Further reading

Conflicts in 1821
Mass murder in 1821
19th century in Istanbul
Massacres during the Greek War of Independence
Massacres in the Ottoman Empire
Massacres committed by the Ottoman Empire
1821 in Asia
Greeks in Istanbul
Greek War of Independence
Persecution of Christians in the Ottoman Empire
Persecution of Eastern Orthodox Christians
Military history of Istanbul
1821 in the Ottoman Empire
Persecution of Greeks in the Ottoman Empire before the 20th century
Massacres of Christians
Anti-Greek sentiment
Anti-Greek pogroms
1821 murders in the Ottoman Empire